Takahara (written: 高原 or 髙原) is a Japanese surname. Notable people with the surname include:

, Japanese footballer
, Japanese footballer
, Japanese racing driver
, Japanese footballer

See also
, river in Gifu Prefecture, Japan

Japanese-language surnames